Kevin Gerard Simms (born 25 December 1964) is a former English rugby union footballer; he gained 15 caps for England as a centre between 1985 and 1988.  He played in the 1987 Rugby World Cup.  He played club rugby for Liverpool St Helens and Wasps.  During his career he captained the North of England against South Africa at Elland RD and the All Blacks at Anfield. He is now a GP in Liverpool. 

Kevin Simms is the son of the rugby league (scrum cap-wearing)  who played in the 1950s and 1960s for Lancashire, St. Helens (A-Team), Rochdale Hornets, Combined Odham/Rochdale Hornets (against New Zealand during the 1961 New Zealand rugby league tour of Great Britain and France) and Odham; Trevor Simms (born ).

References 

1964 births
Living people
English rugby union players
England international rugby union players
Cambridge University R.U.F.C. players
Rugby union centres